The 1982 Kangaroo tour was the fifteenth Kangaroo tour where the Australian national rugby league team played a number of matches against British and French rugby league teams, in addition to the Test matches. The Australia national rugby league team have generally since 1908 barring wartime, toured Great Britain every four years often capping the tour with matches and Tests in France. This regular touring side (and in recent years all Australian representative sides) are known as the Kangaroos.

The 1982 Kangaroos, coached by Frank Stanton dominated, winning both Test series against Great Britain (three Tests) and France (two Tests); winning every match of the tour and earning the nickname The Invincibles. This was the first Kangaroo undefeated touring side winning twenty-two matches played and scoring 1,005 points with 120 against at an average of 45.6 points per game while conceding only 5.4 points per game. The twenty-eight player squad was captained by Max Krilich, with Wally Lewis his deputy. The next Kangaroo Tour was staged in 1986.

Touring party 
The team was coached by the tough and single-minded Balmain Tigers coach Frank Stanton who demanded great discipline and focus from his sides and who was making his third tour. Stanton's first tour came as a player in 1963–64, while this was his second consecutive as coach after also coaching the 1978 Kangaroo tour. Manly-Warringah's Max Krilich was making his second Kangaroo tour and was named captain and carried out his duties coolly and with great application. Queensland captain Wally Lewis was named as tour vice-captain.

Interviewed by journalist/author Ian Whiticker in 2004 Krilich said about the talented squad; "The players in that squad were yet to reach their full potential. We were criticised as a weak side, but nobody knew how great a player Wayne Pearce was going to be on the tour. Wally Lewis was still in his early 20s, and many of the Queenslanders were in the early stages of their careers". He also spoke of Stanton (who was his Manly-Warringah club coach when he had won the 1976 and 1978 NSWRFL premierships, the second of which Krilich was captain of the Sea Eagles): "Frank was a mentally tough coach who totally believed in what he told his players. Great credit must go to Stanton who played down the accomplishment and kept our heads straight." 

While the pair did not enjoy an easy relationship, mostly due to Stanton not being impressed with his attitude to training or habits on tour which actually caused him to put on weight, Wally Lewis also found respect for Stanton he had not previously experienced after making his test debut under him against France in 1981. After missing selection for the first Test in Hull in favour of Parramatta's 1982 premiership winning  Brett Kenny, Stanton challenged Lewis to get back into shape and win his way back into the Test team, something he achieved with selection on the bench for the second Test in Wigan and the third Test in Leeds. Lewis later admitted that early on in the tour his poor attitude did not sit well with Stanton and that it had led to his missing first test selection. Although this was his first Kangaroo Tour, it was not the first tour of Great Britain and France for Lewis who had been a member of the 1977 Australian Schoolboys rugby union tour of Japan, Great Britain and France, a team that included future dual-rugby international Michael O'Connor as well as the Ella brothers Mark, Gary and Glen, cousins of 1982 tourist Steve Ella.

Six players from the 1982 NSWRL premiership winning Parramatta Eels were selected in the squad, a new Kangaroo tour record for the club with all six players playing in at least one test each on the tour. Manly, the team they defeated in the inaugural Winfield Cup Grand Final, also had six players selected. One Manly player considered unlucky not to tour was their Queensland back rower Paul Vautin who had made his test debut earlier in the year against New Zealand and was one of Manly's best in their run to the Grand Final. His non-selection came as a shock to many and rumours started that he had missed out due to the NSW vs Qld selection room politics which prevailed at the time and that he had been a trade-off for a NSW player to be selected (ironically Vautin would be back into the test team for the first test against New Zealand in 1983). 1982 Brisbane premiers Wynnum-Manly had two players selected (Gene Miles and Rod Morris), while the team they defeated in the BRL Grand Final Souths Magpies were represented by Mal Meninga.

One notable absentee was Western Suburbs  Terry Lamb who had represented NSW in the 1981 State of Origin game. Lamb was originally selected to tour but declined to do so due to his upcoming wedding to his fiancé Kim.

Tour managers were the Newtown administrator Frank Farrington and Queenslands, Tom Drysdale. Open Rugby magazine claimed the Australians had brought "a new dimension of excitement and adventure" to the game and former England great Alex Murphy, who called each test for the BBC alongside Ray French, called then "men from another planet."

This was the first Kangaroo tour since the introduction of State of Origin and it allowed Queensland to counter New South Wales' long dominance in representative selection with a record-equalling eleven Queenslanders selected for the tour. This was a considerable increase on the Queensland representation in the 1978 Kangaroos when only three players were selected. Two of those players, Kerry Boustead and Rod Morris, were also members of the 1982 Kangaroos.

Despite there being a record number, the selection of only 11 Queenslander's in the 28 man touring squad was controversial. Queensland had won the 1982 State of Origin series despite being comparatively under prepared due to the NSWRFL clubs refusing to release their Queensland players for pre-series training. Among the Queensland Origin representatives to miss selection were Manly-Warringah's Paul Vautin and Chris Close (who had been the Man of the Match in both Origin games in 1980 and 1981), Wynnum-Manly fullback Colin Scott and South Sydney outside back Mitch Brennan.

Future Kangaroos captain Mal Meninga, making the first of his record four consecutive Kangaroo Tours, was the leading point scorer on tour with 166 from 10 tries and 68 goals, including 48 points in the three Tests against Great Britain (2 tries, 21 goals), and 17 points in the two Tests against France (1 try, 7 goals). John Ribot was the leading try scorer on tour with 25 from just 14 games, including a try in the 3rd test against Great Britain. Ribot added 20 goals to his points tally to join Meninga as the only players on tour to score over 100 points.

|- style="background:#ccf;"
| Player
| Club
| Position(s)
| Tests
| Matches
| Tries
| Goals
| F/Goals
| Points
|- style="background:#fff;"
|  Chris Anderson
|  Canterbury-Bankstown Bulldogs
| 
| 0
| 12
| 8
| 0
| 0
| 24
|- style="background:#fff;"
|  Kerry Boustead
|  Eastern Suburbs Roosters
| 
| 6
| 13
| 9
| 0
| 0
| 27
|- style="background:#fff;"
|  Les Boyd
|  Manly-Warringah Sea Eagles
| 
| 3
| 14
| 3
| 0
| 0
| 9
|- style="background:#fff;"
|  Greg Brentnall
|  Canterbury-Bankstown Bulldogs
| 
| 6
| 13
| 3
| 0
| 0
| 9
|- style="background:#fff;"
|  Ray Brown
|  Manly-Warringah Sea Eagles
| 
| 0
| 14
| 0
| 0
| 0
| 0
|- style="background:#fff;"
|  Greg Conescu
|  Norths Devils (Qld)
| 
| 0
| 14
| 2
| 1
| 0
| 8
|- style="background:#fff;"
|  Steve Ella
|  Parramatta Eels
| 
| 0
| 13
| 21
| 1
| 0
| 65
|- style="background:#fff;"
|  Eric Grothe
|  Parramatta Eels
| 
| 4
| 14
| 21
| 1
| 0
| 65
|- style="background:#fff;"
|  Rohan Hancock
|  Wattles (Darling Downs, Qld)
| 
| 1
| 10
| 0
| 0
| 0
| 0
|- style="background:#fff;"
|  Brett Kenny
|  Parramatta Eels
| 
| 6
| 12
| 6
| 0
| 0
| 18
|- style="background:#fff;"
|  Max Krilich (c)
|  Manly-Warringah Sea Eagles
| 
| 6
| 12
| 1
| 0
| 0
| 3
|- style="background:#fff;"
|  Wally Lewis (vc)
|  Fortitude Valley Diehards (Qld)
| 
| 3
| 14
| 3
| 9
| 0
| 27
|- style="background:#fff;"
|  Paul McCabe
|  Manly-Warringah Sea Eagles
| 
| 3
| 13
| 7
| 0
| 0
| 21
|- style="background:#fff;"
|  Don McKinnon
|  North Sydney Bears
| 
| 0
| 10
| 3
| 1
| 0
| 11
|- style="background:#fff;"
|  Mal Meninga
|  Souths Logan Magpies (Qld)
| 
| 6
| 14
| 10
| 68
| 0
| 166
|- style="background:#fff;"
|  Gene Miles
|  Wynnum-Manly Seagulls (Qld)
| 
| 0
| 11
| 1
| 0
| 0
| 3
|- style="background:#fff;"
|  Rod Morris
|  Wynnum-Manly Seagulls (Qld)
| 
| 0
| 12
| 0
| 0
| 0
| 0
|- style="background:#fff;"
|  Steve Mortimer
|  Canterbury-Bankstown Bulldogs
| 
| 0
| 9
| 6
| 1
| 0
| 20
|- style="background:#fff;"
|  John Muggleton
|  Parramatta Eels
| 
| 1
| 14
| 9
| 0
| 0
| 27
|- style="background:#fff;"
| Mark Murray
|  Fortitude Valley Diehards (Qld)
| 
| 0
| 10
| 4
| 1
| 0
| 14
|- style="background:#fff;"
|  Wayne Pearce
|  Balmain Tigers
| 
| 5
| 13
| 5
| 0
| 0
| 15
|- style="background:#fff;"
|  Ray Price
|  Parramatta Eels
| 
| 3
| 9
| 2
| 0
| 0
| 6
|- style="background:#fff;"
|  John Ribot
|  Manly-Warringah Sea Eagles
| 
| 2
| 14
| 25
| 20
| 0
| 115
|- style="background:#fff;"
|  Rod Reddy
|  St George Dragons
| 
| 4
| 12
| 2
| 0
| 0
| 6
|- style="background:#fff;"
|  Steve Rogers
|  Cronulla-Sutherland Sharks
| 
| 5
| 16
| 10
| 7
| 0
| 44
|- style="background:#fff;"
|  Ian Schubert
|  Eastern Suburbs Roosters
| 
| 0
| 12
| 3
| 0
| 0
| 9
|- style="background:#fff;"
|  Peter Sterling
|  Parramatta Eels
| 
| 5
| 12
| 8
| 0
| 0
| 24
|- style="background:#fff;"
|  Craig Young
|  St George Dragons
| 
| 4
| 11
| 1
| 0
| 0
| 3
|-

By club 
The touring side was represented by 17 New South Welshmen (N) and 11 Queenslanders (Q).

 Manly-Warringah Sea Eagles (5): Max Krilich (captain) (N), John Ribot (Q), Les Boyd (N), Paul McCabe (Q), Ray Brown (N)
 Parramatta Eels (6): Brett Kenny (N), Peter Sterling (N), Steve Ella (N), Eric Grothe (N), Ray Price (N), John Muggleton (N)
 Canterbury Bulldogs (3): Greg Brentnall (N), Chris Anderson (N), Steve Mortimer (N)
 Fortitude Valley Diehards (2): Wally Lewis (vice-captain) (Q), Mark Murray (Q)
 St George Dragons (2): Rod Reddy (Q), Craig Young (N)
 Wynnum-Manly Seagulls (2): Gene Miles (Q), Rod Morris (Q)
 Balmain Tigers (1): Wayne Pearce (N)
 Cronulla-Sutherland Sharks (1): Steve Rogers (N)
 Eastern Suburbs Roosters (2): Ian Schubert (N), Kerry Boustead (Q)
 Norths Devils (1): Greg Conescu (Q)
 North Sydney Bears (1): Don McKinnon (N)
 Souths Magpies (1): Mal Meninga (Q)
 Warwick Wattles (1): Rohan Hancock (Q)

Papua New Guinea and Western Australia 
Before flying to England, half the squad, led by Kangaroos vice-captain Wally Lewis, went to Perth to play Western Australia, while the other half, along with coach Stanton, travelled to Papua New Guinea for Australia's first ever Test match against the Papua New Guinea Kumuls, won 38–2 by the Kangaroos. Nine of the players who travelled to PNG with Stanton would go on to play in the first Test against Great Britain. Winger John Ribot crossed for four tries (though he would be overlooked for the first two Ashes Tests in favour of Eric Grothe), while fullback Greg Brentnall scored twice. Other try scorers for the Kangaroos were Kerry Boustead, Brett Kenny, Mal Meninga and Steve Rogers, while Meninga kicked 4 goals. Peter Sterling, Brett Kenny, Mark Murray and Ray Brown made their test debuts in the match.

Those missing from the 2nd test win over New Zealand earlier in the year at the Sydney Cricket Ground were Michael Cronin who did not tour, and Wally Lewis, Steve Mortimer, Les Boyd and Rod Morris who played in Perth on the same day. Of the quartet that played in Perth, only Boyd would go on to play in the first test against Great Britain.

In Perth, the Kangaroos crossed for 13 tries (with Eric Grothe bagging four) and predictably defeated WA 57–5.

Great Britain 
Once on English soil controversy surfaced when the incumbent Australian Test halves from the mid-year tests against New Zealand, Steve Mortimer and Wally Lewis (both had played the game against WA in Perth), were incomprehensibly not chosen for the opening match. Instead, Stanton chose to go with the halves from the test against Papua New Guinea, Parramatta's Grand Final winning duo Peter Sterling and Brett Kenny. The Eels pair took the field against Hull Kingston Rovers and, playing alongside nine of the eventual first Test team, set about locking up their positions for the first Test on 30 October.

Leading up to the first Test at the Boothferry Park ground in Hull, the Kangaroos also played a tour international match against Wales at Ninian Park in Cardiff on 24 October. The match was played in heavy rain in front of 5,617 fans and Australia, captained by Wally Lewis, ran in nine tries to one in a 37–7 rout. The game marked the first time Lewis, who would take over the Test captaincy in 1984, captained Australia in an international match.

Fiery forward Les Boyd enhanced his reputation for the rough play when he was sent off twice on tour. He was sent off in the first game of the tour against Hull Kingston Rovers at Craven Park, and in the second Test against the Lions at Central Park in Wigan. He was also sin-binned in the third Ashes Test at Headingley in Leeds.

Test Venues 
The three Ashes series tests took place at the following venues.

Hull KR led the Kangaroos 8–5 at half time but that was as good as it got for Roger Millward's men as the Kangaroos piled on 25 points to just 2 in the second half to run out easy 30–10 winners. Man of the Match Mal Meninga lit up Craven Park on his first taste of football on English soil, scoring a try and kicking 6 goals in the win.

Wales 
The Kangaroos played an international against Wales at Ninian Park in Cardiff. This was the first time Wally Lewis (playing in the unfamiliar position of centre) would captain Australia against an international team.

Playing fullback, Steve Ella pressed for test selection by scoring 4 tries in the game. Only two players from the team, second row forward Rod Reddy and reserve winger Kerry Boustead, were considered certainties for selection in the upcoming 1st Ashes test.

The Ashes series 
Due to sponsorship reasons, the 1982 Ashes was known as the "Dominion Insurance Test series".

First Test 
While Australia's side for the opening Test was built around the new breed of young players such as Eric Grothe, Wayne Pearce, Mal Meninga, Brett Kenny and Peter Sterling mixing with veterans Craig Young, Les Boyd, Ray Price, Rod Reddy, Kerry Boustead, Steve Rogers and captain Max Krilich, Great Britain chose five players aged over 30. The only player over the age of 30 for the Kangaroos first test team was Krilich who had turned 33 only five days prior to the test. Great Britain were captained by veteran Leeds hooker David Ward. Making his debut for the Lions was Hull F.C. teenager Lee Crooks who was also handed the goal kicking duties in preference to George Fairbairn. Wayne Pearce was awarded the Man of the Match award after throwing the last pass for four tries and scoring a try himself.

Great Britain did well in the first half to trail by only 10–4 at half time, but the two penalty goals by debutante second rower Lee Crooks was as good as it got for the home side. In the second half the Kangaroos unleashed their skills and fitness, and blazed six tries to leave the British game, and most of the 26,771 strong crowd packed into Hull's Boothferry Park stunned. The game was Australia's 5th straight win over Great Britain, dating back to the final Test of the 1978 Kangaroo Tour and including the 3–0 whitewash of the Lions on their lacklustre 1979 Australasian tour.

In his test debut for Australia, back row forward Wayne Pearce was judged as the Man of the Match thanks to his defensive work and having a hand in a number of tries as well as backing up a break by Max Krilich and Craig Young to race away and score a 45-metre try with only French referee Julien Rascagneres anywhere near him. Centre Mal Meninga, playing his 4th test and the first of what would eventually be a record 17 Ashes tests against Great Britain, scored the opening try of the game after good lead up work by Peter Sterling and Pearce, then easily palming off Les Dyl and outpacing fullback George Fairbairn to score in the corner. Meninga also kicked 8 of 10 goals for a personal haul of 19 points. His 8 goals also broke the record number of goals for an Australian in a test in England, the old record of 7 had been set by Graeme Langlands in the second test of the 1963–64 Kangaroo tour (the famous "Swinton Massacre" test). It also equaled the most goals for an Australian in an Ashes test, the record was previously the sole property of Noel Pidding who kicked 8 in the first test of the 1954 series at the Sydney Cricket Ground.

In commentary for the BBC, former Great Britain and England dual-rugby international forward Ray French stated after the final siren "Well, I've got to eat a little humble pie. I thought Great Britain could do something, but with only those two penalty goals from Lee Crooks its back to the drawing board for the Great Britain selectors I'm afraid", while his commentary partner, Wigan coach, former Lions halfback and Kangaroos tormentor Alex Murphy said during the first half "We need something to combat this lot."

This was the first time that future Australian test halves pair Wally Lewis and Peter Sterling played alongside each other as Australia's five-eighth and halfback.

Emulating what cross-town rivals Hull Kingston Rovers had done in the opening game of the tour, Hull led the Kangaroos at half time, this time 7–0. It would not be until Leeds led Australia 10–6 at Headingley during the 1990 Kangaroo tour that an English club side would lead the Kangaroos at half time of a tour match. However, a double to Eric Grothe and another to Kerry Boustead, with Meninga kicking 2 goals, along with Australia keeping Hull scoreless in the second saw the Kangaroos keep their undefeated record alive with a 13–7 win in front of 16,049 fans. This was the largest tour match attendance at The Boulevard since Australia defeated a combined Hull / Hull KR XIII 37–14 during the 1956–57 Kangaroo tour. It was also the Kangaroos 9th win in a row over Hull since 1911–12 and the largest tour match attendance of the 1982 tour.

Australia played the game with the same team that would line up in the second test at Wigan just 4 days later.

Second Test 
Despite ten changes to the Lions' side, with only winger Des Drummond and props Trevor Skerrett and Jeff Grayshon (who also took over the captaincy) retained from the first Test thrashing, the second Test was scarcely a contest and the Kangaroos won by 27–6. The only change to the Kangaroos was tour vice-captain Wally Lewis' inclusion on the bench. With captain Max Krilich in some doubt with a niggling neck injury, hooker forward Ray Brown was also selected on the Kangaroos bench.

Prior to the second test, Phil Larder, the Coaching Director of the British Amateur Rugby League Association (BARLA) spent a week in camp with Frank Stanton and the Kangaroos to observe their training and tactics. After Great Britain's first test humiliation, Larder (who was not actually connected to the Great Britain team in any way) had taken it upon himself to contact Stanton and request the opportunity. English football had begun to fall well behind Australia in recent years and Larder's initiative was rewarded by being made the Coaching Director of the Rugby Football League in 1983. He would also become the assistant coach of the Great Britain side in 1983.

Australia's fiery forward Les Boyd was sent off late in the first half for kicking a tackled player on the ground. The touch judge, only seeing Boyd's kick and not that it was in reaction to tackled Lions hooker John Dalgreen lashing out with a boot at Boyd while he was on the ground, came on with his flag up and French referee Julien Rascagneres, who did not actually see the incident, did not hesitate in sending Boyd off, leaving the Kangaroos to play out the remaining 46 minutes with twelve men.

Eric Grothe suffered a knee injury while scoring a try late in the first half and was replaced at half time by Wally Lewis. The injury would see Grothe miss the third Test, played a week later in Leeds. Lewis came straight in to the five-eighth position while Brett Kenny moved to the centres and Mal Meninga out to the wing. Half-way through the second half Lewis showed the 23,126 crowd at Central Park what the British game was missing when he sent a bullet like 20 metre pass to Meninga to score in the corner. The pass did psychological damage to the Lions, who wondered just how good the Kangaroos really were if a player who could pass like Lewis did could not even make the starting XIII.

Third Test 
Injuries forced Frank Stanton to make three changes to the Kangaroos for the final Test. Eric Grothe's knee injury in the second Test kept him out with the tour's leading try scorer John Ribot re-claiming his test spot on the wing; Rod Morris replaced Craig Young in the front row; while second test man of the match Ray Price was also ruled out with a knee injury and was replaced by Paul McCabe in the second row allowing Wayne Pearce to move to his favoured position at lock forward.

Kangaroos coach Frank Stanton predicted that the third Test would be the best contested of the three, and he was proved correct until the final ten minutes of play. Recalled Widnes halfback Andy Gregory, and Bradford Northern hooker Brian Noble (making his Test debut), led the way for the Lions and provided a service to their speedy outside backs that Britain had lacked in the first two Tests. The Lions made more line breaks in the third Test at Headingley than they had in the previous two Tests combined. The Australian's ran with a very strong breeze in the first half and used this to their advantage, keeping much of the play in Great Britain's half, though they were unable to cross the British try line. Mal Meninga kicked three goals (two from near half-way) while Hull youngster Lee Crooks kicked two long range penalties into the breeze to keep the Lions in the game at 6–4 at half time. Lions winger Des Drummond brought the crowd to its feet mid-way through the half with a 40-metre run from near his own line before he was brought down on half-way by Greg Brentnall and Steve Rogers in cover.

The first try of the game came with just on 50 minutes gone. From deep in his own half, Brentnall made a break down the right wing after breaking a tackle. The play looked like breaking down when he didn't pass to an un-marked Kerry Boustead on his outside and was tackled from behind by a desperate David Stephenson. From there the Kangaroos spread the ball to the opposite wing where Ribot was tackled. Wayne Pearce then broke the British line before passing to Rod Reddy who gave the ball to Ribot flying on his outside. Ribot crashed over in the corner with Lions fullback George Fairbairn clinging to his legs. Pearce then made another break and sent captain Max Krilich on a 30-metre run for his first try of the tour. Krilich scored under the posts giving Meninga an easy conversion and Australia held a 14–4 lead. With just over 10 minutes left to play the Aussies were holding-off Great Britain by 14–8 and an intense finish loomed after Hull F.C. winger Steve Evans had scored the Lions only try of the series (it was also the first try the Australians had conceded in all 11 Tests they'd played since the second Ashes Test of 1979 against the Lions in Brisbane). It seemed Britain had not been so far behind Australia's standard after all, but in the final 10 minutes the Kangaroos superior fitness told and they ripped the home side apart with 4 tries to Boustead, Pearce, Steve Rogers and Man of the Match Brett Kenny to run out win 32–8 winners and become the first touring side to go through Britain undefeated.

Right on half-time there was a set-to between forwards Les Boyd and Mick Crane which resulted in an all-in brawl. Boyd had hit Lions captain David Topliss (their third captain in as many tests) with a shoulder charge on the half-way line and Topliss had lashed out with his feet at Boyd who then punched Topliss as he lay on the ground, with Crane then coming in and began trading punches with the Australian front rower. As the teams lined up for the second half, referee Rascagneres called out both Boyd and Crane and sent both to the sin-bin for 10 minutes.

The Ashes series win was Australia's 4th straight over the Lions dating back to 1974, and their second straight 3–0 Ashes series win. It also continued the streak started by the 1963–64 Kangaroos of successfully defending The Ashes in England. As of 2017, this was also the last test Australia played at Headingley. Starting with the 1986 Kangaroo tour, all test matches Australia has played in Leeds have been played at the Elland Road stadium, home of the Leeds United soccer club, due to its greater spectator capacity (Elland Road currently holds 37,890 while Headingley has a capacity of 21,062).

France

First Test 
The tourists found the French Tests more of a challenge than the British, but in the end the Kangaroos prevailed and finished their tour unbeaten.

During the first half, Wally Lewis dislocated his shoulder while attempting to tackle a French player which ended his tour, though as there were only 2 weeks remaining he remained with the squad until they returned to Australia (the injury was a recurrence of a similar injury he had suffered while touring Great Britain and France with the Australian Schoolboys rugby union team in 1977). He was replaced by Eric Grothe who went to the wing, Mal Meninga moved to his preferred centre with Brett Kenny moving to 5/8. Within 12 minutes of being on the field, Grothe had scored two tries.

Second Test

Statistics 
Largest Attendance
 26,771 – First test vs Great Britain at Boothferry Park

Largest Club Game Attendance
 16,049 – Australia vs Hull F.C. at The Boulevard

Leading Point Scorer
 169 by Mal Meninga (11 tries, 68 goals)

Leading Try Scorer
 25 by Eric Grothe

The tally of 25 tries by Eric Grothe includes 4 tries scored in the match against Western Australia.  The leading try scorer in Great Britain and France was Steve Ella, with 22. Ella also scored one try against Papua New Guinea.

Aftermath 
Following the most successful Kangaroo Tour in history, a number of Australians were targeted by English clubs. Over the next 3 years players such as Peter Sterling (Hull F.C.), Brett Kenny and Steve Ella (Wigan), Eric Grothe (Leeds), Wally Lewis (Wakefield Trinity) and Mal Meninga (St Helens) would have short, but successful stints in England.

See also 
 Heads, Ian and Lester, Gary (1988) 200 Years of Australian Sport, Lester Townsend, Sydney
 Whiticker, Alan(2004) Captaining the Kangaroos, New Holland, Sydney
 Andrews, Malcolm (2006) The ABC of Rugby League Austn Broadcasting Corpn, Sydney
 Australian cricket team in England in 1948

References

External links 
 1982 Kangaroo Tour of Great Britain and France at rl1908.com
 1982 Kangaroo Tour of Great Britain and France at rlhalloffame.org.uk
 Ashes Series 1982 at rugbyleagueproject.com
 "1982 Kangaroos Tour of England and France" by Jason Cave (theroar.com.au)

Kangaroo Tour
Kangaroo Tour
Kangaroo Tour
Kan
Rugby league tours of Great Britain
Rugby league tours of France
Australia national rugby league team tours
1982 in Welsh rugby league
Rugby league tours of Papua New Guinea